Trezaise is a hamlet south of Roche, Cornwall, England, United Kingdom.

References

Hamlets in Cornwall